= Most Beautiful Model in Nigeria =

Nigerian beauty pageant

- Formation: 2015; 11 years ago
- Type: Beauty pageant
- Headquarters: Abuja
- Location: Nigeria
- Official language: English
- Pageant organizer: Alex Nwankwo
- Pageant coordinator: Esther Ezenwonye
- Website: Official Website

Most Beautiful Model in Nigeria, also abbreviated as MBMN, is a beauty pageant that was created in Nigeria in 2015 by Alex Nwankwo.

== History ==
The pageant started in Abuja, Nigeria in 2015. Jennifer Obi from Anambra State was crowned the first Most Beautiful Model in Nigeria. In 2016, during the second edition, Yvette Meurer from Delta State was crowned as the winner. In 2018, during the third edition, Favour Umeike was crowned as the winner.

== Titleholders ==
Year	MBMN	State Represented	Runner-Up	State Represented	Ref
2015	Jennifer Obi	Anambra State	Sandra Bassey	Akwa Ibom State	
2016	Yvette Meurer	Delta State	Christy Daniels	Akwa Ibom State	
2018	Favour Umeike	Abuja	Anita Patrick	Edo State	
